Jozef Dolný (born 13 May 1992) is a Slovak footballer who plays for 1. FC Tatran Prešov.

External links
 1. FC Tatran Prešov profile

References

1992 births
Living people
Slovak footballers
Slovak expatriate footballers
1. FC Tatran Prešov players
MFK Zemplín Michalovce players
FC Zbrojovka Brno players
FK Dukla Banská Bystrica players
FK Senica players
Podbeskidzie Bielsko-Biała
Derry City F.C. players
MFK Skalica players
Slovak Super Liga players
2. Liga (Slovakia) players
Czech First League players
League of Ireland players
Sportspeople from Spišská Nová Ves
Association football forwards
Slovak expatriate sportspeople in Poland
Slovak expatriate sportspeople in the Czech Republic
Expatriate association footballers in Ireland
Expatriate footballers in the Czech Republic
Expatriate footballers in Poland